Minerva Mill was a cotton spinning mill in Ashton-under-Lyne, Greater Manchester, England. It was built between 1891 and 1892 for the Minerva Spinning Company which was later known as the Ashton Syndicate.  Minerva Mill was next to the later Texas mill, at Whitelands. It ceased spinning cotton in the 1920s and was demolished in 1937.

Location
Minerva mill was built in  a bend in the River Tame, close to the Huddersfield Narrow Canal, at Whitelands.  It was at the end of Minerva Road.

History
The Minerva Spinning Company Limited was registered in 1891 to build the Minerva Mill at Whitelands. The directors were Messrs Barlow, Marland, Coop, Newton, Pollitt and Pownall; they were later referred to as the Ashton syndicate. The syndicate went on to build the Rock Mill, Atlas Mill, Curzon Mill,  Tudor Mill, Cedar Mill and finally the adjoining Texas Mill.  The Minerva Spinning Company went out of business in the 1920s.

Architecture

It was designed by Sydney Stott. Four storeys over a basement.

Power
The steam engine was a 1500 hp twin triple expansion engine by Daniel Adamsons, of Openshaw built in 1906. The cylinders were christened Capital and Labour. It had an  18 ft flywheel that operated at  75 rpm. The flywheel drove 40 ropes that transmitted the power to each floor. The cylinders all had Corliss valves. They had a 48in throw, the High pressure was  22 ½" in diameter, the intermediate was 34 in and the low pressure was 56in. The air pump was driven from the low pressure crosshead, there was a Saxon governor on the high pressure end of the bed.

Equipment
The mule frames were provided by John Hetherington and Sons Ltd. On startup here were 86,868 mule spindles spinning medium counts from American cotton, that was  40's twists and 65 wefts. By 1903, this had increased to 93828, and by 1920, 22,000 doubling spindles had been added.
In order to run these spindles in the spinning rooms, the cotton had to be prepared using openers, scutchers, carding engines.

Usage
Minerva Mill was used for spinning fine counts of Egyptian cotton, both twists and weft.

Owners
 The Ashton syndicate
 Minerva Spinning Company

See also 

Textile manufacturing

References
Notes

Bibliography

External links
 www.cottontown.org
 www.spinningtheweb.org.uk

Textile mills in Tameside
Cotton mills
Cotton industry in England
Buildings and structures in Ashton-under-Lyne
Buildings and structures demolished in 1937
Demolished buildings and structures in Greater Manchester